The M&S Bank Arena, previously Echo Arena Liverpool, has hosted many entertainment events since its opening in 2008. A list of entertainment events are given in the tables below in an chronological order.

2008–2010

2011–2020

2021–onwards

Notes

References 

British entertainment-related lists
Entertainment events in the United Kingdom
Events in Liverpool
Lists of events by venue
Lists of events in the United Kingdom
Liverpool-related lists